Hà Đông (literally East of the river) is an urban district (quận) of Hanoi, the capital city of Vietnam. The district currently has 17 wards, covering a total area of 49.64 square kilometers. As of 2019, there were 397,854 people residing in the district, the third highest of all districts in Hanoi, after Hoàng Mai. The district borders Thanh Trì district, Thanh Xuân district, Nam Từ Liêm district, Hoài Đức district, Quốc Oai district, Chương Mỹ district, Thanh Oai district.

Hà Đông has a large number of monuments, landmarks, relics, traditional festivals and craft villages. It is an important transport hub and is also home to various government offices and universities.

Hà Đông was once the capital city of former Hà Tây province. In 2009, it became an urban district of Hanoi due to the incorporation of Hà Tây Province to Hanoi.

Wards
Hà Đông district is subdivided to 17 wards, including:
 Biên Giang
 Dương Nội
 Đồng Mai
 Hà Cầu
 Kiến Hưng
 Mộ Lao
 Nguyễn Trãi
 Phú La
 Phú Lãm
 Phú Lương
 Phúc La
 Quang Trung
 Trần Phú
 Vạn Phúc
 Văn Quán
 Yên Nghĩa
 Yết Kiêu

Climate

See also
Hồ Đắc Điềm, past governor
Hà Tây province, historic province
Hà Nội (Hanoi), capital of Vietnam

References

Districts of Hanoi